Jules Plisson (born 20 August 1991) is a French rugby union player. His position is Fly-half and he currently plays for Clermont in the Top 14.

References

External links
Jules Plisson: ERC profile

1991 births
Living people
French rugby union players
Sportspeople from Neuilly-sur-Seine
Stade Français players
Stade Rochelais players
ASM Clermont Auvergne players
Rugby union fly-halves
France international rugby union players